Rubus inferior is a North American species of flowering plants in the rose family. It has been found only in the state of Florida in the southeastern United States.

The genetics of Rubus is extremely complex, so that it is difficult to decide on which groups should be recognized as species. There are many rare species with limited ranges such as this. Further study is suggested to clarify the taxonomy.

References

inferior
Plants described in 1925
Endemic flora of Florida
Flora without expected TNC conservation status